John Henry Downes (18 October 1870 in Glasgow – 1 January 1943 in Hunters Quay) was a Scottish sailor who competed for the Royal Clyde Yacht Club at the 1908 Summer Olympics.

He was mate of the Scottish boat Hera, which won the gold medal in the 12 metre class.

References

External links 
 
 

1870 births
1943 deaths
Sportspeople from Glasgow
Olympic sailors of Great Britain
British male sailors (sport)
Olympic gold medallists for Great Britain
Olympic medalists in sailing
Sailors at the 1908 Summer Olympics – 12 Metre
Scottish Olympic medallists
Scottish male sailors (sport)
Medalists at the 1908 Summer Olympics